A press subsidy is given by the government to newspapers in Luxembourg under the Law of 13 August 1998 on the Promotion of the Printed Press.  They are awarded automatically to all general-interest newspapers appearing at least once a week that have full-time staffs of at least five journalists and of which advertisements constitute less than 50% of the newspaper.

The total programme amounted to €7,754,499 in 2009.  One-third of the total subsidy is spread evenly between qualifying newspapers, with the other two-thirds being proportional to the number of pages.  All newspapers except the dominant Luxemburger Wort depend on the press subsidy for survival.

In addition, newspapers received indirect subsidy by a preferential postal rate, a ceiling on television and radio advertising, and a reduced value added tax rate of 3%.

2009 subsidies

Footnotes

References
 

Government of Luxembourg
Mass media in Luxembourg
Press subsidies